[[Image:Esaltation of the Eucaristy - Sputnik.png|thumb|right|Celestial sphere of the Disputa', often mistaken for the Sputnik satellite']]
Ventura di Archangelo Salimbeni (also later called Bevilacqua; 20 January 1568 – 1613) was an Italian Counter-Maniera painter and printmaker highly influenced by the vaghezza and sensual reform of Federico Barocci.

Biography

Salimbeni was born in Siena. He studied painting, together with his half-brother Francesco Vanni, under their father Arcangelo Salimbeni in his native Siena,

He possibly spent some time, in Northern Italy and then moved to Rome in 1588 to work, together with others, on the fresco painting of the Vatican Library under pope Sixtus V.

During 1590-1591, he received a commission from Cardinal Bonifazio Bevilacqua Aldobrandini for paintings in the Roman Jesuit Church of the Gesù and the Basilica di Santa Maria Maggiore. These paintings show the influence of Cavalier D'Arpino and the Counter-Mannerist Barocci pupil Andrea Lilio.

Salimbeni returned to Siena in 1595. Here he persisted in a Reformist or Counter-Maniera style. He was here influenced by Federico Barocci as can be seen in the draperies, highlighted with abrupt changes of light and flickering surfaces, of his painting "Birth of a Virgin" in the San Domenico church in Ferrara (1607–1608).

He completed painting cycles (1595–1602) for Sienese churches such as the Oratory of Santa Trinità. He is known for detailed preparatory drawings, most of which are now in the Uffizi in Florence or the Fine Arts Museum of San Francisco. At around 1600, he began painting the "Life of St Hyacinth" for the Sienese church of Santo Spirito. These paintings show the innovative perspective and style of the Florentine Reformers Ludovico Cigoli Cigoli and Domenico Passignano Domenico Passignano.  He continued to create paintings for churches throughout Italy, including Florence. At the Basilica della Santissima Annunziata di Firenze, he frescoed lunettes (1605–1608) illustrating events in the history of the Servite Order. In the Duomo di San Salvatore, he executed a magnificent John the Baptist.

At about the same time, around 1600, he got an assignment in Assisi for a fresco of the "Resurrection of Christ" and the "Dying Saint Clare is visited by the pope"  in the vault of chapel of San Massimo in the Basilica of Santa Maria degli Angeli.

In 1603, Salimbeni was commissioned to paint frescoes with scenes from the church's patron saints Quiricus and Julietta for the church of Ss Quirico e Giulitta, one of the oldest churches in Siena. As in the church of Santa Trinità, he worked here alongside the painter Alessandro Casolari.

This period saw a proliferation of new assignments: three paintings for the church San Lorenzo in San Pietro in Montalcino, the "Donation of the Keys" (1599), the "Glorification of the Eucharist" (1600), and the "Crucifixion" (1604).

At the same time he was painting the "Vision of Gregory the Great" and the "Punishment of David" in the Basilica of San Pietro in Perugia. The papal legate, cardinal Bonifazio Bevilacqua (1571–1627), who had commissioned these paintings, was so pleased that he invested Ventura Salimbeni with the Order of the Golden Spur, a very selective papal order. He was even authorized  from now on to name himself Cavalieri Bevilacqua. He painted the canvas of the Ascension of the Virgin (1607) for San Frediano, Pisa.

In 1612 he painted the "Life of Saint Galganus" for the Church of the Santuccio in Siena with the hermit saint set in a wooded landscape.

His last work of art was the oil painting the "Marriage of the Virgin" for the Seminario Diocesano in Foligno in 1613.

He was influenced by Federico Barocci, Domenico Beccafumi, and by the rich and harmonious palette of Lodovico Cigoli. Among his pupils was Alessandro Casolani.

In the period between 1589 and 1594 he also made in Rome some etchings, of which seven survive. They are among the finest Italian prints of the period. The earliest dated, and the largest, is the Baptism of Christ of 1589, which he produced in collaboration with the more experienced Ambrogio Brambilla.

Anthology of worksSt. Agnes (1590, etching, De Young Museum, San Francisco, California)
The Annunciation (1594, drawing, De Young Museum)Marriage of the Virgin (1590 De Young Museum)
Two Studies of a Female (De Young Museum)Figure Studies of a Man and a Seated Woman (De Young Museum)
Studies of a Male Figure with a Sword (De Young Museum)
Madonna and Child (De Young Museum)
Figure Studies of a Man and a Standing Woman (De Young Museum)Joachim and Anna (1590, etching, De Young Museum)The Annunciation (Museum of Fine Arts, Budapest)Death of St Claire with Pope Innocent IV's blessing, drawing Fitzwilliam Museum, Cambridge, UK
Christ on the Cross with Virgin, Magdalen, & Saint John (Courtauld Institute of Art, London)Two studies of the head of a woman, and sketch of a foot (Courtauld Institute of Art, London)
Youth kneeling holding a vase (Courtauld Institute of Art, London)
Marriage of the Virgin (Diocesan Seminary, Foligno)
The Virgin and Child in Glory, (1590 Grand Rapids Art Museum, Michigan)Trinity with St.Peter and St. Bernard, (Musée Fesch, Ajaccio, Corsica)Study for an Altarpiece (drawing, Fogg Art Museum, Boston, MA)Saint Caterina acceca con lo sguardo and Florentine Soldiers (Haarlem, Teylers Museum)Saint Lorenzo and Saint Charles Borromeo Pray to the Name of Jesus(1620, San Lorenzo of Grosseto).Frescoes of Christ’ Resurrection (Bagno Vignoni)Depiction of Ventura Salimbeni (Bernardino Capitelli, 1634)Fresco of the Trinity at work with globe (Montalcino)Resurrection of Christ'' in the Chapel of the removal of the Lord in the Basilica of Santa Maria degli Angeli in Assisi, Italy.

References

External links

 Video Church of San Pietro and artwork by Ventura Salimbeni

1568 births
1613 deaths
16th-century Italian painters
Italian male painters
17th-century Italian painters
Painters from Siena
Mannerist painters
Italian printmakers
Catholic painters